The Baraboo Air Line Railroad was a railroad chartered in Wisconsin to join Madison, Wisconsin to Winona, Minnesota in 1870. It became part of the Chicago and North Western Railroad route from Chicago to Winona, Minnesota. After abandonment by the C&NW, part of the Baraboo Air Line route became the first rail trail, the Elroy-Sparta State Trail. Currently, the line from Madison to Reedsburg is operated by the Wisconsin and Southern Railroad. The portion from Reedsburg to Elroy is now the 400 State Trail. The portion from Sparta through Medary is now the La Crosse River Trail.

History
The railroad had its beginnings in a meeting in March 1865 to charter the "Madison, Lodi & Baraboo Valley Railroad Company."

The line was charted on June 1, 1870, to join the Beloit & Madison Railroad in Madison, Wisoconsin to the La Crosse, Trempealeau & Presscott Railroad at Winona Junction. This would connect a though line of the Chicago and North Western Railroad with its subsidiary, the Winona and St. Peter Railroad. On March 10, 1871, it was consolidated with the C&NW.

By 1872, twenty miles were finished to Lodi, Wisconsin. The ridges between Elroy and Sparta were tunneled at great expense and with much difficulty. The Baraboo Air-Line Rail Road connected to the LaCrosse, Trempeleau & Prescott Railroad at Winona Junction and opened for traffic in September 1873, through to Winona, Minnesota.  In 1874, the C&NW reported an expenditure for its three tunnels of $476,743.32 and for the construction of 129 miles of railroad between Madison and Winona Junction of $5,342,169.96.

References

See also
Air-line railroad

Defunct Wisconsin railroads
Railway companies established in 1870
Railway companies disestablished in 1871
Predecessors of the Chicago and North Western Transportation Company
1870 establishments in Wisconsin
1871 disestablishments